Giants Live was created in 2009 as the official Tour that qualifies strongmen to compete in the annual World's Strongest Man contest. At each Grand Prix, up to twelve international strongmen come together and compete over six events. The top three at each contest will receive an invitation to compete at the World's Strongest Man contest for that same year. With 9 wins, Iceland's Hafþór Júlíus Björnsson is the greatest Giants Live champion of all-time.

History
On April 27, 2009, Giants Live was named the Official World's Strongest Man Qualifying Tour for 2009–2011, thus taking over from the Strongman Super Series in this regard. The first 2009 qualifying event took place on May 17 at the Mohegan Sun Casino Arena in Uncasville, Connecticut, and with the second event being the Viking Power competition.

Giants Live was licensed the exclusive rights by IMG Sports Media, the creator and owner of the World's Strongest Man competition. Previously, the qualifying tournament was known as the IFSA Strongman Super Series from 2001–2004, and the World's Strongest Man Super Series from 2005–2008. Strongman Super Series continued to operate under the title of "Strongman Super Series" in 2009 and 2010, but did not have WSM qualifying status. The qualifying status went with Giants Live and Colin Bryce, the Tour's producer.

At each Grand Prix event, in common with previous such series, each competitor competes in six different tests of strength with the winner crowned Grand Prix Champion. The top three athletes at each tournament will win a qualifying slot at the World's Strongest Man competition.

Along with the Strongman Champions League, this event made important progress in acting as a fundamental part of a unifying movement for world strength athletics by making plans to help SCL get its athletes to the 2009 World's Strongest Man contest. SCL chief, Mostert, stated that "The top 5 SCL athletes will have places in the Giants Live tour for qualifying at World's Strongest Man (WSM) 2009". In addition, he also stated that wild cards for the WSM will include SCL athletes. He went on to say that "Finally we made it all possible again that all the athletes have chances to qualify for the WSM, which means in my opinion the WSM will have the strongest field ever in her history!" He went on to thank TWI/IMG and Giants Live for their part in making these possibilities. This was groundbreaking because for a number of years prior to this, the athletes under the IFSA had been banned by the federation from entering WSM (since the IFSA fell out of favour with TWI). Likewise, the athletes invited to participate in WSM were not invited to participate in IFSA events. Some competitions bridged the divide, such as the Arnold Strongman Classic and the Fortissimus, but neither had the history, gravitas, or popular appeal of the World's Strongest Man. Most of the IFSA athletes, with the demise of the IFSA finances, competed in SCL from 2008. This deal, along with the Fortissimus deal before it, united strongman in a way it had not been since 2004.

Producers and key staff
Giants Live is a collaboration between IMG Media and Power Productions UK - owned by Colin Bryce:

 Colin Bryce – an ex-Strongman competitor and Olympic bobsleigher, Bryce is currently a long-term producer of World Strongest Man through his company Power Productions and formerly the head referee and commentator on strongman events such as World's Strongest Man, Britain's Strongest Man, Strongman Super Series and World Strongman Cup.
 Darren Sadler – an ex-Strongman competitor and former world champion in the U105 category, Sadler is currently a co-producer of World Strongest Man alongside Colin Bryce and formerly the head referee on for Giants Live competitions.
 Magnús Ver Magnússon – an ex-Strongman competitor and four-time holder of World's Strongest Man, Magnússon is currently the head referee for Giants Live and World's Strongest Man competitions.
 Bill Kazmaier – an ex-Strongman competitor and three-time holder of World's Strongest Man, Kazmaier is currently one of three main commentators for Giants Live competitions, alongside Neil Pickup and Radzi Chinyanganya.
 Neil Pickup – formerly a professional arm wrestler, Pickup is currently one of three main commentators for Giants Live competitions, alongside Bill Kazmaier and Radzi Chinyanganya. Pickup is also the MC for these events.
 Radzi Chinyanganya – Radzi is currently one of three main commentators for Giants Live competitions, alongside Neil Pickup and Bill Kazmaier.
 Nev & Neo – The duo dream team behind the live feed
 Dave Warner – Ex strongman competitor and multiple time UK strongest man competitor. One of the head judges. Judged Eddie's 500kg deadlift

Event results

Most wins

References

External links
Giants Live official website
www.colinbryce.com
Europe's Strongest Man official website

Strongmen competitions